A hitman is an assassin involved in contract killing.

Hitman, Hit Man, or Hitmen may also refer to:

Arts, entertainment and media

Fictional characters
 Hitman (DC Comics), a fictional character in the DC Comics universe
 Hitman (Marvel Comics), a fictional character in the Marvel Comics universe

Literature
 Hitman: Enemy Within, a novel by William C. Dietz
 Hit Man, a novel by Lawrence Block
 Hit Man: A Technical Manual for Independent Contractors, a 1983 book by Rex Feral
 Hit Men: Power Brokers and Fast Money Inside the Music Business, an exposé of the music industry by Fredric Dannen
 Hitman (manga), a Japanese manga series by Kouji Seo

Film and television 
 Hit Man (1972 film), a 1972 action film starring Pam Grier
 The Hit Man, a 1991 TV film, see J. Terry Williams
 The Hitman, a 1991 action/adventure film starring Chuck Norris
 Hitman (1997 film), a British action film
 Hitman (1998 film), an Hong Kong action film 
 Hitman (2007 film), a film based on the Hitman video game series starring Timothy Olyphant
 Hitman: Agent 47, a 2015 film based on the Hitman video game series, starring Rupert Friend
 Hitman (2014 film), a Bangladeshi film 
 Hit Man (American game show)
 Hitman (British game show), a quiz programme
 Hitman: David Foster & Friends, American TV special featuring David Foster
 "Hitman", an episode of Law & Order
 "Hitman" (Adventure Time), a 2011 episode of the American animated television series Adventure Time
 Hitman Hart: Wrestling with Shadows, a 1998 documentary about wrestler Bret Hart
 Hit Men (film), 2016 film with Happy Anderson

Video games 
 Hitman (franchise), a media franchise (video games and films)
Hitman (2016 video game), a 2016 entry in the series
Hitman 2 (2018 video game), a 2018 entry in the series
Hitman 3, a 2021 entry in the series

Music 
 The Hitmen, an Australian hard-rock band
 The Hitmen (British band)
 Hittman (born 1974), American rapper
 The Hitmen (production team)

Albums 
Hit Men, album by Daevid Allen & Kramer
 Hit Man (album), an album by Neal Morse
 The Hit Man, Marvin Gaye
 The Hit Men (The Stranglers album), a compilation album by The Stranglers

Songs 
 "The Hitman", a song by AB Logic
 "The Hitman", a song by Queen from Innuendo

Sports 
 Calgary Hitmen, a junior ice hockey team; named for professional wrestler Bret Hart (see below)
 New York/New Jersey Hitmen, an American XFL football team

People 
 The Hitman (nickname)
 Uzi Hitman (1952–2004), Israeli singer, songwriter, composer, and television personality

See also

 
 
 
 
 Cleaner (disambiguation)
 Cleaner (crime)
 Fixer (disambiguation)
 Fixer (person)
 The Hitman's Bodyguard (2017 film) action-comedy film starring Ryan Reynolds and Samuel L. Jackson
 The Hitman's Wife's Bodyguard (2021 film) action-comedy film starring Ryan Reynolds and Samuel L. Jackson and Salma Hayek
 The Hitman and Her, British music television programme